Jacqueline 'Jackie' Bellinger is a female former international table tennis player from England.

Table tennis career
She represented England at two successive World Table Tennis Championships, from 1983-1985, in the Corbillon Cup (women's team event).

She won two English National Table Tennis Championships in the doubles, in 1985 and 1987, with her younger sister Lisa Lomas-Bellinger. Her representative county was Bedfordshire.

See also
 List of England players at the World Team Table Tennis Championships

References

Living people
1964 births
English female table tennis players